Svenska Cupen 1996–97 was the forty-second season of the main Swedish football Cup. The competition was concluded on 29 May 1997 with the final held in Borås. AIK won 2-1 against IF Elfsborg before an attendance of 9,547 spectators.  Group matches introduced in the previous year's competition were abandoned and Division 4 clubs again entered the competition in large numbers.

Preliminary round 1

For other results see SFS-Bolletinen - Matcher i Svenska Cupen.

Preliminary round 2

For other results see SFS-Bolletinen - Matcher i Svenska Cupen.

First round

For other results see SFS-Bolletinen - Matcher i Svenska Cupen.

Second round

For other results see SFS-Bolletinen - Matcher i Svenska Cupen.

Third round

For other results see SFS-Bolletinen - Matcher i Svenska Cupen.

Fourth round

For other results see SFS-Bolletinen - Matcher i Svenska Cupen.

Fifth round
The 8 matches in this round were played between 10 April and 24 April 1997.

Quarter-finals
The 4 matches in this round were played on 8 May 1997.

Semi-finals
The semi-finals were played on 15 May 1997.

Final
The final was played on 29 May 1997 in Borås.

Footnotes

References 

Svenska Cupen seasons
Cupen
Cupen
Sweden